Wacky Rollers Football Club is a Dominican football club based in Saint Joseph. The club most recently played in the top tier, Dominica Premier League, but were relegated to the Dominican Division One.

References

External links 
 DFA Profile
 Facebook Page

Football clubs in Dominica